High Seas Driftnet Fisheries Enforcement Act of 1992 is United States declaration citing an observance of the United Nations
international driftnet fishery conservation program to restrict large scale driftnet fishing in high seas or international waters. The Act of Congress acknowledges the United Nations General Assembly Resolutions imposing a global moratorium on all high seas driftnet fishing by December 31, 1992. In accordance with Title 16 section 1857, the United States federal law 102-582 proclaims the Magnuson–Stevens Fishery Conservation and Management Act prohibits the application of large scale driftnet fishing within an exclusive economic zone of any sovereign state and the United States.

The 1992 legislation was drafted as House Bill H.R. 2152 and Senate Bill S. 884. The H.R. 2152 bill superseded the S. 884 bill which was passed by the 102nd United States Congressional session and enacted into law by the 41st President of the United States George H.W. Bush on November 2, 1992.

Titles of the Act
The federal statute was drafted as five titles defining the United States bearing on judicial enforcement and marine conservation of large scale driftnet fishing in the Seven Seas.

Title I - High Seas Large-Scale Driftnet Fishing
Denial of port privileges and sanctions for high seas large-scale driftnet fishing
Duration of denial of port privileges and sanctions
Requirements under Marine Mammal Protection Act of 1972
Definitions

Title II - Fisheries Conservation Programs
Import restrictions under Fishermen's Protective Act of 1967
Enforcement
Trade negotiations and the environment

Title III - Fisheries Enforcement in Central Bering Sea
Prohibition applicable to United States vessels and nationals
Port privileges denial for fishing in Central Bering Sea
Duration of port privileges denial
Restriction of fishing in United States exclusive economic zone 
Definitions
Termination

Title IV - Miscellaneous Provisions
Intermediary nations involved in export of certain tuna products
Authority to extend reemployment rights
Limitation on terms of voting members of regional fishery management councils
Observer fee for North Pacific fisheries research plan

Title V - Fees
Recreational boat tax repeal
Automated tariff filing and information system

See also

Drift netting
Federal Maritime Commission
Gillnetting
National Marine Fisheries Service
North Pacific Fishery Management Council
United Nations Convention on the Law of the Sea

References

External links
 
 
 
 
 
 

1992 in law
1992 in American law
1992 in the environment
102nd United States Congress
Environmental impact of fishing
Fish conservation
Fisheries law